Luis Alejandro Osorio González (born 24 September 1976), commonly known as Alejandro Osorio or sometimes Janino, is a Chilean former footballer who played as a midfielder.

Club career
Flywheel offensive plays by right and his current team is Cobreloa of the First Division Chile. He was champion of the Apertura 1997 tournament and the 2005 Clausura tournament with Universidad Católica.

International career
Osorio played for Chile in both the 1993 FIFA U17 World Championship in Japan, where Chile reached the third place, and the 1995 FIFA U20 Championship in Qatar. In addition, he took part of Chile squad in the 1993 South American U17 Championship

At under-23 level, he represented Chile in the 1996 Pre-Olympic Tournament.

At senior level, he made eight appearances for Chile between 1997 and 2001, including both the 1997 and the 2001 Copa América.

Coaching career
In 2012, Osorio worked as the manager of Academia Machalí in the Tercera B, the fifth level of the Chilean football league system.

Honours

Club
Universidad Católica
 Primera División de Chile (2): 1997 Apertura, 2005 Clausura

International
Chile U17
 FIFA U-17 World Cup Third place: 1993

References

External links
 
 
 Alejandro Osorio at playmakerstats.com (English version of ceroacero.es)

1976 births
Living people
People from Rancagua
Chilean footballers
Chile international footballers
Chile youth international footballers
Chile under-20 international footballers
O'Higgins F.C. footballers
Club Deportivo Universidad Católica footballers
Estudiantes de La Plata footballers
S.C. Beira-Mar players
C.D. Antofagasta footballers
Deportes Concepción (Chile) footballers
Ñublense footballers
Cobreloa footballers
Chilean Primera División players
Argentine Primera División players
Primeira Liga players
Chilean expatriate sportspeople in Argentina
Chilean expatriate sportspeople in Portugal
Expatriate footballers in Argentina
Expatriate footballers in Portugal
1997 Copa América players
2001 Copa América players
Chilean football managers
Association football midfielders